Bernhard Schweitzer (3 October 1892, in Wesel – 16 July 1966, in Tübingen) was a German classical archeologist.

Life 
From 1911-1917, he studied classical archaeology and philology in Heidelberg and Berlin. He received his doctorate in 1917 in Heidelberg under Friedrich von Duhn with a thesis on "Studies on the chronology of the geometric styles in Greece I". In 1921, Bernhard Schweitzer studied in Heidelberg and in 1925 became a professor. He succeeded Herbert Koch in Leipzig.

Schweitzer was not a member of the Nazi party, but only joined its affiliated social welfare organization, the National Socialist People's Welfare  (Nationalsozialistische Volkswohlfahrt), in 1937. In 1945, he became the first rector of the University of Leipzig to the end of the war. In 1948, he was the successor of Carl Watzinger at Tübingen, where he retired in 1960.

Writings 
 Herakles. Aufsätze zur griechischen Religions- und Sagengeschichte (Tübingen 1922)
 Der bildende Künstler und der Begriff des Künstlerischen in der Antike (Heidelberg 1925)
 Xenokrates von Athen. Beiträge zur Geschichte der antiken Kunstforschung und Kunstanschauung (Königsberg 1932)
 Studien zur Entstehung des Porträts bei den Griechen (Leipzig 1940)
 Das Menschenbild der griechischen Plastik (Potsdam 1944)
 Die Bildniskunst der römischen Republik (Leipzig 1948)
 Die geometrische Kunst Griechenlands. Frühe Formenwelt im Zeitalter Homers (Köln 1969)
 Zur Kunst der Antike I-II. Ausgewählte Schriften (Tübingen 1963)

Literature 
 Werner Fuchs: Bernhard Schweitzer 1892–1966. In: Reinhard Lullies/ Wolfgang Schiering (Hrsg.) Archäologenbildnisse. Porträts und Kurzbiographien von Klassischen Archäologen deutscher Sprache. von Zabern, Mainz 1988, S. 258–259, .
 Ulrich Hausmann: Bernhard Schweitzer †. In: Gnomon 38 (1966), S. 844–847.
 Stefanie Müller: Schweitzer, Bernhard, Wer war wer in der DDR? 5. Ausgabe. Band 2, Ch. Links, Berlin 2010, .
 
 Helga A. Welsh: Entnazifizierung und Wiedereröffnung der Universität Leipzig 1945-1946. Ein Bericht des damaligen Rektors Professor Bernhard Schweitzer, In: Vierteljahrshefte für Zeitgeschichte, Jahrgang 33, 1985, Heft 2, S. 339-372. (online; PDF; 1,6 MB)

References

External links 
 
 Schweitzer auf der Webseite des Instituts für klassische Archäologie der Universität Leipzig
 Bernhard Schweitzer im Professorenkatalog der Universität Leipzig

1892 births
1966 deaths
Academic staff of the University of Königsberg
Academic staff of the University of Tübingen
Classical archaeologists
Members of the Prussian Academy of Sciences
People from Wesel